Deep Lake may refer to:

Antarctica
Deep Lake (Antarctica), a lake north of Cape Barne, Ross Island

United States
Deep Lake (California), a lake in Siskiyou County
Deep Lake (Colorado), a lake in White River National Forest
Deep Lake (Florida), a natural sinkhole in Big Cypress National Preserve
Deep Lake (Oregon), several lakes
Deep Lake (Thurston County, Washington), a lake in Millersylvania State Park